The Cunningham-Hembree Estate, in Windsor, California, which includes two houses, was listed on the National Register of Historic Places in 2018.

Cunningham House
The Cunningham House, built , was listed by Windsor's town council as a Windsor historical landmark.  It is the oldest known structure in Windsor. It is located at 9225 Foxwood Dr..

Hembree House
The Hembree House was built in 1931.  It was listed by the town council, too.
It has also been called “Mattapan”, an Indian word meaning “I sit down” according to family members.  It is located at 9225 Foxwood Dr..

References

National Register of Historic Places in Sonoma County, California
Buildings and structures completed in 1850
Buildings and structures completed in 1931